The Turkish Women's Regional Football League was the third-level league competition for women's association football in Turkey.

History
The Women's Regional League was established in 2009 launching its first season in the 2009–10. It was replaced by Turkish Women's Third Football League in 2014.

Format
At the 2010–11 season, 23 teams competed for promoting to the Women's Second League. They were divided into 4 groups according to their geographical location. In each group, teams play against each other home-and-away in a round-robin format. After folding all teams were promoted to Women's Second League.

Teams promoted to Women's Second League

2010–11 season
The 2010-11 Turkish Women's Regional Football League consisted of 23 teams.

See also
 Women's football in Turkey
 Turkish Women's Football Super League
 Turkish Women's Football First League
 Turkish Women's Second Football League
 Turkish Women's Third Football League
List of women's football clubs in Turkey
Turkish women in sports

External links
 Official Site  of the Turkish Football Federation

Sports leagues established in 2009
Regional
Football
Third level football leagues in Europe
Professional sports leagues in Turkey